Accused is a true crime investigative journalism podcast created by Cincinnati Enquirer reporter Amber Hunt and photographer Amanda Rossmann.  three seasons have been published, each of which analyzes a different suspicious death case. By the conclusion of Season 1, the podcast had been downloaded 430,000 times and reached No. 1 on iTunes' podcast chart.

History

Season 1 
The first season focused on the murder of Elizabeth Andes, a 23-year-old Miami University graduate, who was stabbed to death on December 28, 1978. Andes' boyfriend Bob Young had found her body and was immediately questioned in her death. After 15 hours of interrogation, including being given a lie detector test that he was told he failed, Young confessed to the murder. He immediately recanted, saying that Hamilton County Lt. Richard Carpenter, the polygraph administrator, had "scared the hell out of me." Young faced a murder trial the following spring but was acquitted by the jury. In 1981, Young was tried again for Andes' death in civil court after Andes' family sued him for wrongful death. He was found not liable by the jury. Accused presented three other acquaintances of Andes' who were not seriously investigated at the time by police in Oxford, Ohio.

Season 1, which was originally published under the title Accused: The Unsolved Murder of Elizabeth Andes, premiered on September 7, 2016. It originally ran for eight episodes, concluding on September 28. A ninth episode titled "The Update" was released on December 26. The transcripts for the first season were released in September 2018 as a book from Diversion Books.

Season 2 
Season 2 focused on the 1987 murder of Retha Welch, a 54-year-old grandmother and prison minister. She was found beaten to death in the bathtub of her Newport, Kentucky apartment. An acquaintance named William Virgil was convicted in her murder, but his conviction was overturned after DNA testing found his semen was not among three samples found inside of the victim at the time of her death.

The second season premiered on October 12, 2017 and ran for eight episodes, concluding on November 2.

Season 3 
Hunt and Rossmann announced on social media in summer 2018 that they were working on a third season of Accused. Season 3 premiered on December 3, 2019, and ran for eight episodes (plus two bonus episodes), concluding on January 28, 2020. It focused on the 1984 death of Dave Bocks, a pipe fitter who worked at a controversial uranium processing plant in Fernald, Ohio. Police determined that Bocks jump or dove into a vat of molten salt kept at 1,350 degrees Fahrenheit. An experiment conducted by the podcast found it would have been incredibly difficult, if not impossible, for a man his size to enter through the available 9-inch-by-22-inch opening on top of the vat.

Awards

See also 
 List of American crime podcasts

References

External links 
 
 Official page on Wondery podcast network

2016 podcast debuts
Crime podcasts
Audio podcasts
The Cincinnati Enquirer
Investigative journalism
American podcasts
Patreon creators